Saint-Jean-Brévelay is a commune in the Morbihan department of Brittany in north-western France. Inhabitants of Saint-Jean-Brévelay are called in French Brévelais.

Administration
The mayor of Saint-Jean-Brévelay is Guénaël Robin. Saint-Jean-Brévelay is part of the communauté de communes Centre Morbihan Communauté.

International relations

Saint-Jean-Brévelay is twinned with Botley, United Kingdom.

Sport

Two football clubs bear the name of Saint-Jean-Brévelay, Espérance Football-Club de Saint-Jean-Brévelay and Amicale Sportive Brévelaise. Both clubs share the Stade Municipal for their home games. There are two clubs in this small city for historical and religious reasons, the first one is catholic and the second one is secular.

See also
Communes of the Morbihan department

References

External links

 Mayors of Morbihan Association 

Saintjeanbrevelay